Alison Louise Kennedy (born 22 October 1965) is a Scots writer, academic and stand-up comedian. She writes novels, short stories and non-fiction, and is known for her dark tone and her blending of realism and fantasy. She contributes columns and reviews to European newspapers.

Biography
Kennedy was born in Dundee to Edwardene Mildred, a teacher, and Robert Alan Kennedy, a psychology lecturer. Her parents divorced when she was 13. She attended the fee-paying High School of Dundee and went on to study for a BA Hons in Theatre Studies and Dramatic Arts at the University of Warwick.

From 1987 to 1989, Kennedy was a community arts worker for Clydebank District Council. She then went on to a role as writer-in-residence for Hamilton and East Kilbride Social Work Department from 1989 to 1991. Her work there won a special Social Work Today Award in 1990. From 1989 to 1995 she worked on Project Ability, a Glasgow-based visual arts organisation. In 1995 she was a part-time lecturer at the University of Copenhagen.

In 2009, she donated the short story Vanish to Oxfam's Ox-Tales project, four collections of stories written by 38 authors. Her story was published in the "Air" collection. In 2016, her novel Serious Sweet was long-listed for the Booker Prize.

In December 2019, along with 42 other leading cultural figures, she signed a letter endorsing the Labour Party under Jeremy Corbyn's leadership in the 2019 general election. The letter stated that "Labour's election manifesto under Jeremy Corbyn's leadership offers a transformative plan that prioritises the needs of people and the planet over private profit and the vested interests of a few."

In 2020 she began contributing a column on her views of Brexit to the German daily paper Süddeutsche Zeitung.

Kennedy currently lives in Wivenhoe and has been an associate professor in Creative Writing at the University of Warwick since 2007, having previously taught creative writing at the University of St Andrews from 2003 to 2007.

She has performed as a stand-up comedian at the Edinburgh Fringe and literary festivals. Her main comedy club has been The Stand Comedy Club in Edinburgh.

Awards and honours
Scottish Arts Council Book Award four times
1993, 2003 Granta Best Young British Novelist
1991 Saltire Society Scottish First Book of the Year, Night Geometry and the Garscadden Trains
1993 Edinburgh Fringe First, The Audition
1994 Somerset Maugham Award, Looking for the possible dance
1996 Encore Award winner, So I Am Glad
2007 Saltire Society Book of the Year, Day
2007 Lannan Literary Award for fiction
2007 Austrian State Prize for European Literature winner
2007 Costa Book Awards Book of the Year, winner for Day
2008 Internationale Eifel-Literatur-Preis
2014 Frank O'Connor International Short Story Award shortlist All the Rage
2016 Heinrich Heine Prize

Works

Novels
Looking for the Possible Dance (1993) 
So I Am Glad (1995) 
Everything You Need (1999) 
Paradise (2004) 
Day (5 April 2007) 
The Blue Book (4 August 2011) 
Doctor Who: The Drosten's Curse (14 July 2015) 
Serious Sweet (19 May 2016) 
The Little Snake (6 November 2018)

Short story collections
Night Geometry and the Garscadden Trains (1990) 
Now That You're Back (1994) 
Tea and Biscuits (1996) 
Original Bliss (1997) 
Indelible Acts (2002) 
What Becomes (6 August 2009) 
All the Rage (2014) 
We Are Attempting To Survive Our Time (2020)

Non-fiction
Life & Death of Colonel Blimp (1997) 
On Bullfighting (1999) 
On Writing (2013) 
’’Care of the Luwak’’ (2010)

Screenwriting
Stella Does Tricks (1997)
Dice (2001), with John Burnside

Selected radio
Confessions of a Medium (2010), broadcast as the Saturday Play on BBC Radio 4, 13 March 2010 and 1 March 2013
Happy Families (2011), broadcast on BBC Radio 3, 1 September 2011
Love Love Love Like The Beatles (2012), broadcast as the Afternoon Drama on BBC Radio 4, 26 June 2012
AA: America's Gift to the World (2014), broadcast on BBC Radio 4, 6 April 2015
Subterranean Homesick Blues (beginning 2015), broadcast on BBC Radio 4 from 14 September, 2015

References

External links

A L Kennedy at the Guardian
BBC profile
AL Kennedy reading at writLOUD in London

1965 births
20th-century Scottish novelists
21st-century Scottish novelists
20th-century Scottish women writers
21st-century Scottish women writers
Living people
Academics of the University of St Andrews
Academics of the University of Warwick
Fellows of the Royal Society of Literature
John Llewellyn Rhys Prize winners
People from Dundee
People educated at the High School of Dundee
Scottish non-fiction writers
Scottish women novelists
Scottish short story writers
British women short story writers
20th-century British short story writers
21st-century British short story writers
Writers from Dundee
Scottish republicans